Jwalamukhi may refer to:

 Jwalamukhi (poet) (1938–2008), Indian poet, novelist, writer and political activist
 Jwalamukhi (1980 film), a 1980 Hindi film
 Jwalamukhi (2000 film), a 2000 Hindi-language Indian film

See also
 Jawalamukhi, Himachal Pradesh, India